CXXC-type zinc finger protein 5 is a protein that is encoded by the CXXC5 gene in humans.

As indicated by its name, the CXXC5 plays a role as a transcription factor in the nucleus of cells, and involved in myelopoiesis, endothelial differentiation, vessel formation, and oligodendrocyte differentiation.

The CXXC5 is also characterized as a negative feedback regulator of the Wnt/β-catenin signaling pathway functioning by direct interaction with the Dishevelled (Dvl) protein in the cytosol. The cytosolic overexpression of CXXC5 was induced by several pathophysiological conditions, such as osteoporosis, alopecia, senescence of growth plate, cutaneous wound, and restoration of the suppressed Wnt/β-catenin signaling by blockade of its Dvl binding function improved the pathological features as observed in Cxxc5-/- mice. These results indicate that the Dvl binding with cytosolic CXXC5 could be a target for the development of agents for treating alopecia, acute wound, and short stature in childhood and adolescence, which exhibit suppressed Wnt/β-catenin signaling by cytosolic CXXC5 overexpression of the responsible tissue cells. The CXXC5-Dvl protein-protein interaction (PPI) as a target for development of agents in hair loss or acute wound was also confirmed by construction and testing the function of PTD-DBM, a peptide inhibiting the CXXC5-Dvl PPIl.

The improvement of abnormalities by the CXXC5-Dvl PPI inhibitor is attributed to restoration of damaged tissues by activating the stem cells through restorative activation of the suppressed Wnt/β-catenin signaling and its target genes involving regeneration.

References

Further reading

External links 
 
GRCh38: Ensembl release 89: ENSG00000171604 - Ensembl, May 2017
GRCm38: Ensemble release 89: ENSMUSG00000046668 - Ensembl, May 2017
"Human PubMed Reference" National Center for Biotechnology Information, U.S. National Library of Medicine.
"Human PubMed Reference" National Center for Biotechnology Information, U.S. National Library of Medicine.